Events from the year 1922 in Romania. The year saw the Dealul Spirii Trial and the crowning of King Ferdinand.

Incumbents
 King: Ferdinand I.
 Prime Minister:
 Take Ionescu (until 19 January).
 Ion I. C. Brătianu (from 19 January).

Events
 23 January – The Dealul Spirii Trial of members of the Communist Party commences.
 1 March – A general election is held for the Chamber of Deputies and Senate, running until 11 March. The governing National Liberal Party retains power.
 11 April – In a hearing, the prime minister publicly commends the work of the Communist Party.
 13 April – The king signs the  Bessarabian Treaty, confirming the Union of Bessarabia with Romania.
 4 June – The government issues an amnesty decree for the release of the Dealul Spirii convicts, which is signed by the king two days later.
 15 October – Ferdinand is crowned King of Romania at Coronation Cathedral, Alba Iulia. 
 18 December – The Magyar Party is founded.

Births
 28 February – Radu Câmpeanu, politician, jurist, and economist (died 2016).
 23 April – Pavel Chihaia, novelist (died 2019).
 26 April – Ștefan Augustin Doinaș, poet, political prisoner and politician (died 2005).
 29 May – Iannis Xenakis, architect and avant-garde composer (died 2001).
 7 June – Egon Balas, mathematician (died 2019).
 17 October – Tudor Ganea, mathematician (died 1971).
 30 October – Iancu Țucărman, agricultural engineer (died 2021).

Deaths
 22 January – Alexandru Ciurcu, inventor of a form of rocket engine (born 1854).
 3 June – Duiliu Zamfirescu, novelist, poet, and short story writer, member of the Romanian Academy (born 1858).
 29 November – Vasile Lucaciu, Greek Catholic priest and an advocate of equal rights (born 1852).

References

Years of the 20th century in Romania
1920s in Romania
 
Romania
Romania